Agonopterix pseudorutana is a moth in the family Depressariidae. It was first described by Turati in 1934. It is found in Libya.

References

Moths described in 1934
Agonopterix
Moths of Africa